The Evil Queen, also called the Wicked Queen, is a fictional character and the main antagonist of "Snow White", a German fairy tale recorded by the Brothers Grimm; similar stories exist worldwide. Other versions of the Queen appear in subsequent adaptations and continuations of the fairy tale, including novels and films. One particularly notable version is Disney's depiction, sometimes known as Queen Grimhilde. The character has also become an archetype that inspired unrelated works.

The Evil Queen is Snow White's evil and vindictive stepmother who is obsessed with being "the fairest in the land". The beautiful young princess Snow White evokes the Queen's sense of envy, so the Queen designs a number of plans to kill Snow White through the use of witchcraft. A driving force in the story is the Queen's Magic Mirror. In the traditional resolution of the story, the Queen is grotesquely executed for her crimes. The tale is meant as a lesson for young children warning them against the dangers of narcissism, pride, and hubris. 

In some retellings of the fairy tale, the Queen has been re-imagined or portrayed more sympathetically, such as being morally conflicted or suffering from madness instead of being simply evil. In some of the revisionist stories she serves as the protagonist and has even been portrayed as an antihero or a tragic hero.

In "Snow White"

In the Brothers Grimm tale

The Evil Queen is a very beautiful but proud and arrogant woman who marries the King after the death of his first wife, the mother of Snow White.  The Evil Queen owns a magic mirror, which one day informs her that her young stepdaughter Princess Snow White has surpassed her in beauty.

After deciding to eliminate Snow White, the Queen orders her Huntsman to take the princess into the forest and kill her. The Queen tells him to bring back Snow White's lungs and liver, as proof that the princess is dead. However, the Huntsman takes pity on Snow White, and instead, brings the Queen the lungs and liver of a wild boar. The Queen has the cook prepare the lungs and liver and she eats what she believes are Snow White's organs.

While questioning her mirror again, the Queen discovers that Snow White has survived. Intending to kill Snow White herself, she takes the disguise of an old peddler woman. She visits the dwarfs' house and sells Snow White laces for a corset that she laces too tight in an attempt to asphyxiate the girl. When that fails, the Queen returns as a comb seller and tricks Snow White into using a poisoned comb. When the comb fails to kill Snow White, the Queen again visits Snow White disguised as a farmer's wife and gives Snow White a poisoned apple.

Snow White is awakened by a Prince from another kingdom, and they invite the Queen to their wedding. Although fearing what will happen, her own jealousy drives her to attend. There she is forced to put on red-hot iron shoes and "dance" until she drops dead.

Alternative fates

In the classic ending of "Snow White", the Evil Queen is put to death by torture. This is often considered to be too dark and potentially horrifying for children in modern society. Sara Maitland wrote that "we do not tell this part of the story any more; we say it is too cruel and will break children's soft hearts." Therefore, many (especially modern) revisions of the fairy tale often change the gruesome classic ending in order to make it seem less violent. In some versions instead of dying, the Queen is merely prevented from committing further wrongdoings. However, in the same 2014 nationwide UK poll that considered the Queen from "Snow White" the scariest fairy tale character of all time (as cited by 32.21% of responding adults), around two-thirds opined that today's stories are too "sanitised" for children.

Already the first English translation of the Grimms' tale, written by Edgar Taylor in 1823, has the Queen choke on her own envy upon the sight of Snow White alive. Another early (1871) English translation by Susannah Mary Paull "replaces the Queen's death by cruel physical punishment with death by self-inflicted pain and self-destruction" when it was her own shoes that became hot due to her anger.

Other alternative endings can have the Queen just instantly drop dead "of anger" at the wedding or in front of her mirror upon learning about it, die from her own designs going awry (such as from touching her own poisoned rose) or by nature (such as falling into quicksands while crossing a swamp on her way back to the castle after poisoning Snow White), be killed by the dwarfs during a chase, be destroyed by her own mirror, run away into the forest never to be seen again, or simply being banished from the kingdom forever.

Analysis

Origins and evolution
In the first edition of the Brothers Grimm story, from their 1812 collection Kinder- und Hausmärchen ("Children's and Household Tales"), the Queen is Snow White's biological mother. In subsequent versions after 1819, this was changed; text was added to include that Snow White's mother died and the king remarried. Jack Zipes said that the change was made because the Grimms "held motherhood sacred." According to Sheldon Cashdan, Professor of Psychology at the University of Massachusetts, a "cardinal rule of fairy tales" mandates that the "heroes and heroines are allowed to kill witches, sorceresses, even stepmothers, but never their own mothers". Zipes' 2014 collection of Grimm fairy tales in their original forms reinstated the Queen as Snow White's mother.

However, the wicked stepmother was not unknown in German versions predating the Brothers Grimm's collection. In 1782, Johann Karl August Musäus published a literary fairy tale titled "Richilde" which reimagined the folktale from the villain's point of view. The main character is Richilde, arrogant Countess of Brabant, who as a child received the gift of a magic mirror invented by her godfather Albertus Magnus. Many elements of the Grimms' Snow White appear in this story, including the wicked stepmother, the magic mirror, the poisoned apple, and the punishment of dancing in red-hot shoes.

Diane Purkiss attributes the Queen's fiery death to "the folkbelief that burning a witch's body ended her power, a belief which subtended (but did not cause) the practice of burning witches in Germany", while the American Folklore Society noted that the use of iron shoes "recalls folk practices of destroying a witch through the magic agency of iron".

Rosemary Ellen Guiley suggests that the Queen uses an apple because it recalls the temptation of Eve; this creation story from the Bible led the Christian Church to view apples as a symbol of sin. Many people feared that apples could carry evil spirits, and that witches used them for poisoning. Robert G. Brown of Duke University also makes a connection with the story of Adam and Eve, seeing the Queen as a representation of the archetype of Lilith. The symbol of an apple has long had traditional associations with enchantment and witchcraft in some European cultures, as in case of Morgan le Fay's Avalon ("Isle of the Apples").

Oliver Madox Hueffer noted that the wicked stepmother with magical powers threatening a young princess is a recurring theme in fairy tales; one similar character is the witch-queen in "The Wild Swans" as told by Hans Christian Andersen. According to Kenny Klein, the enchantress Ceridwen of the Welsh mythology was "the quintissential evil stepmother, the origin of that character in the two tales of Snow White and Cinderella". 

Equivalents of the Evil Queen can be found in Snow White-like tales from around the world. In the Scottish Gaelic oral tale "Gold-Tree and Silver-Tree", the Queen is named Silver-Tree and is the heroine's biological mother. A talking trout takes the place of the Queen's mirror and the huntsman figure is the princess' own father. The villain's relationship with Snow White can also vary, with versions from around the world sometimes featuring wicked sisters or sisters-in-law, or a wicked mother of the prince. One early variation of the tale was Giambattista Basile's "The Young Slave," where the heroine's mother is unintentionally involved in putting her to sleep, and she is awoken by her cruel and jealous aunt who treats her like a slave. 

The Queen's tricks also vary from place to place. In Italy, she uses a toxic comb, a contaminated cake, or a suffocating braid. In France, a local tale features a poisoned tomato. The Queen's demands of proof from the huntsman (often her lover in non-Grimm versions) also vary: a bottle of blood stoppered with the princess' toe in Spain, or the princess' intestines and blood-soaked shirt in Italy.

Interpretations
According to some scholars such as Roger Sale and University of Hawaii professor Cristina Bacchilega, the story has ageist undertones vilifying the older woman character, with her envy of Snow White's beauty.  Terri Windling wrote that the Queen is "a woman whose power is derived from her beauty; it is this, the tale implies, that provides her place in the castle's hierarchy. If the king’s attention turns from his wife to another, what power is left to an aging woman? Witchcraft, the tale answers. Potions, poisons, and self-protection." 

Sandra Gilbert and Susan Gubar regard Snow White and her mother/stepmother as two female stereotypes, the angel and the monster. The fact that the Queen was Snow White's biological mother in the first version of the Grimms' story has led several psychoanalytic critics to interpret "Snow White" as a story about repressed Oedipus complex, or about Snow White's Electra complex and sexual rivalry with the Queen. According to Bruno Bettelheim, the story's main motif is "the clash of sexual innocence and sexual desire". Cashdan interprets the Queen's motives as "fear that the king will find Snow White more appealing than her." This struggle is so dominating the psychological landscape of the tale, that Gilber and Gubar even proposed renaming the story "Snow White and Her Wicked Stepmother". Harold Bloom opined that the three "temptations" all "testify to a mutual sexual attraction between Snow White and her stepmother." 

According to Bettelheim, "only the death of the jealous queen (the elimination of all outer and inner turbulence) can make for a happy world." Cashdan opined "the death of the witch signals a victory of virtue over vice, a sign that positive forces in the self have prevailed," and "the active involvement of heroine in the witch's demise communicates to readers that they must take an active role in overcoming their own errant tendencies." The evil queen "embodies narcissism, and the young princess, with whom readers identify, embodies parts of the child struggling to overcome this tendency. Vanquishing the queen represents a triumph of positive forces in the self over vain impulses." Similarly, the psychologist Betsy Cohen wrote that "in order to avoid becoming a wicked queen herself, Snow White needs to separate from and kill off this destructive force inside of her."

Regarding the manner of the Queen's execution, Jo Eldridge Carney, Professor of English at The College of New Jersey, wrote: "Again, the fairy tale's system of punishment is horrific but apt: a woman so actively consumed with seeking affirmation from others and with violently undoing her rival is forced to enact her own physical destruction as a public spectacle." Scholars such as Cashdan, Sheldon Donald Haase, and John Hanson Saunders argue from psychological and storytelling viewpoints that the Queen's punishment fits her crimes, gives closure to the reader and shows good triumphing over evil. Likewise, Mary Ayers of the Stanford University School of Medicine wrote that the red-hot shoes symbolise that the Queen was "subjected to the effects of her own inflamed, searing hot envy and hatred." It was also noted that this ending echoes the fairy tale of "The Red Shoes", which similarly "warns of the danger of attachment to appearances." 

Anthony Burgess commented: "Reading that, how seriously can we take it? It is fairy-tale violence, which is not like real mugging, terrorism and Argentinean torture." On the other hand, writers such as Oliver Madox Hueffer have expressed sympathy for the queen or, like psychology professor Sharna Olfman, remove the violence when reading the story to children while also acknowledging that verbal storytelling lacks "graphic visual imagery."

In other media
The character was portrayed in a variety of ways in the subsequent adaptations reimagining the classic fairy tale. According to Lana Berkowitz of the Houston Chronicle, "Today stereotypes of the evil queen and innocent Snow White often are challenged. Rewrites may show the queen is reacting to extenuating circumstances." Scott Meslow, of The Atlantic, noted that "Disney's decision to throw out the Grimms's appropriately grim ending—which sentences the evil queen to dance in heated iron shoes until her death—has meant that ending is all but forgotten."

Film 

The 1916 silent film Snow White was based on the 1912 play Snow White and the Seven Dwarfs. In the play, written by "Jessie Graham White" (Winthrop Ames), Queen Brangomar is jealous of Prince Florimond's love of Snow White. Brangomar summons Witch Hex (Hexy), a powerful godmother. In the end, Snow White forgives the Queen and, despite objections from the hunter (Berthold) who wants Brangomar dead, lets her go away unharmed. In the 1916 film, Queen Brangomar (played by Dorothy Cumming) and the Witch are two separate characters, and it is the latter who demands to have the heart of Snow White. In the end, Brangomar is punished by being turned into a peacock. Elements from these versions of "Snow White" inspired Disney's film adaptation. 

In Disney's 1937 animated film Snow White and the Seven Dwarfs, the Queen, usually known as the Evil Queen or the Wicked Queen, is the villain. This version of the character was sometimes referred to as Queen Grimhilde in Disney publications from the 1930s, and was originally voiced by Lucille La Verne. The film's Queen, in the form of an old witch, falls to her death after poisoning Snow White. In the film, similar to the Brothers Grimm story, the Queen is cold, cruel, and extremely vain, and obsessively desires to remain the "fairest in the land". She becomes madly envious over the beauty of her stepdaughter, as well as the attentions of the Prince from another land; such love triangle element is one of Disney's changes to the story. This leads her to plot the death of Snow White and ultimately on the path to her own demise, which in the film is indirectly caused by the Seven Dwarfs. The film's version of the Queen character uses her dark magic powers to actually transform herself into an old woman instead of just taking a disguise like in the Grimms' story; this appearance of hers is commonly referred to as the Wicked Witch or alternatively as the Old Hag or just the Witch. The film's version of the Queen was created by Walt Disney and Joe Grant, and originally animated by Art Babbit and voiced by Lucille La Verne. Inspiration for her design came from several sources, including the characters of Queen Hash-a-Motep from She and Princess Kriemhild from Die Nibelungen, as well as actresses such as Joan Crawford and Gale Sondergaard. The Queen has since been voiced by Eleanor Audley, Louise Chamis and Susanne Blakeslee, and was portrayed live by Anne Francine, Jane Curtin and Olivia Wilde, and in alternative versions, by Lana Parrilla (Once Upon a Time) and Kathy Najimy (Descendants). This interpretation of the classic fairy tale character has been very well received by film critics and general public, often being considered one of Disney's most iconic and menacing villains. Besides in the film, the Evil Queen has made numerous appearances in Disney attractions and productions, including not only these directly related to the tale of Snow White, such as Fantasmic!, The Kingdom Keepers and Kingdom Hearts Birth by Sleep, sometimes appearing alongside Maleficent from Sleeping Beauty. The film's version of the Queen has also become a popular archetype that influenced a number of artists and non-Disney works. 
Gal Gadot is set to portray the character in the 2024 live-action film adaptation of the 1937 animated film.

In the 1961 film Snow White and the Three Stooges, the Queen is played by Patricia Medina. She transforms into an old witch and the Stooges inadvertently shoot her down from her broom, killing the Queen. She has a companion in the film, the evil wizard Count Oga, who is killed when he falls into a pot of boiling tar.
The 1987 musical film Snow White was one of the nine Cannon Movie Tales fairy tale musicals produced in the 1980s. Diana Rigg starred as the Queen. The plot follows the story of the original fairytale including the three attempts by the Queen to kill Snow White (a tight bodice, a poisoned silver comb and finally the poisoned half of a red and white apple, the white half having no poison in it in order to trick Snow White into thinking the apple is harmless). When she is invited to Snow White's wedding, the Queen damages the mirror in rage, causing her to age rapidly. After arriving at the wedding, she shatters into glassy pieces and disintegrates.
In the 1997 film Snow White: A Tale of Terror, the character is not a queen, but rather a noblewoman named Lady Claudia Hoffman, played by Sigourney Weaver who was acclaimed for her role. 
In the 2001 television film Snow White: The Fairest of Them All, a self-loathing crone named Elspeth (Miranda Richardson), who is part of a race of strange humanoid creatures, is transformed into a beautiful queen by her brother, the Green-Eyed Granter of Wishes (Clancy Brown). She becomes jealous when the mirror reveals that her stepdaughter Snow White is the fairest in the land, but in this adaptation she is driven more by insecurities than vanity. She also envies the affection that Prince Alfred shows toward her stepdaughter. She disguises herself as Snow White's deceased mother Josephine and succeeds in poisoning her with an apple. At the climax of the film, the Green-Eyed One turns Elspeth into a withered old crone once again and she is throttled to death off-screen by the dwarves whom she had once turn to stone. Josephine is played by Vera Farmiga and the Old Crone form is played by Karin Konoval.
In the 2012 comedy film Mirror Mirror, Julia Roberts plays Queen Clementianna, a vain, insecure woman who married the king and magicked him into a savage beast using a special necklace. The Queen spends her time by organizing lavish parties in the palace and buying expensive dresses, while neglecting the kingdom which has caused the people to struggle to survive in harsh weather and poverty due to high taxes by her. She often uses her magic to do her bidding but it often backfires with unintended consequences. She uses a magic mirror to talk to a much younger reflection of herself (played by Lisa Roberts Gillan), and the reflection often warns her not to use her magic for selfish short-sighted purposes. In her attempts to kill Snow White, she creates two giant wooden puppets to attack the dwarfs' home, and she also commands the Beast to attack. Once Snow destroys the Beast's necklace, the Queen begins to age as her reflection states that she must pay the price for her use of magic, and she eats her own poisoned apple offscreen at Snow White's wedding.

In another 2012 adaptation, Snow White and the Huntsman, Charlize Theron played the Queen. In this retelling, her title is Queen Ravenna. The Queen is depicted as vain, scheming, and power-hungry. On their wedding night, she kills the King, and fears that Snow White will challenge her rule over the kingdom. The Queen's obsession with power and beauty stems from childhood trauma, when her mother told her that beauty is a weapon to be used for protection. Additionally, the strength of her powers seems to correlate to her appearance, and both begin to fade as Snow White comes into her own. Her Magic Mirror assures her that the only way to render her powers and her youth permanent is to consume Snow White's heart, but she is ultimately killed by Snow White. Director Rupert Sanders said: "It was very important that we didn’t have a terrible cut-out villain. We had someone who was doing evil things from a fear and weakness. I think it is important that you do sympathize with her to a degree, but also really understand why she is the person she’s become because she wasn’t born evil. It was a journey for her to become evil, and I think it was very important to myself and Charlize Theron to play a realistic version of the queen." Theron said about the character: "At first, I didn't really understand why she was evil or losing her mind, but once I understood that it wasn't just the fact that her mortality relied upon finding Snow White, and that knowing that and not being able to do anything and being stuck in a castle. Well, I think that would be maddening for somebody like her. It reminded me a lot of Jack Nicholson's character in The Shining - that idea that you're stuck in this place and you can't escape it, that cabin fever." Theron reprises her role in the film's sequel, The Huntsman: Winter's War, in which she was revealed to have hidden part of herself in the Mirror, allowing her to be restored to life by her sister.

Television 

In all seven seasons of the 2011–2017 American TV series Once Upon a Time, the Queen, also known as Regina Mills, is portrayed by Lana Parrilla. Regina saves Snow White's life when they are younger, leading to Regina's unwilling marriage to Snow's father. When Snow inadvertently causes the death of Regina's true love, Regina grows vengeful and becomes the Evil Queen. After years of failing to kill Snow White, the Evil Queen eventually casts the Dark Curse, provided by her mentor Rumplestiltskin, sending all the fairytale characters to the real world and erasing their true memories. During the curse, Regina adopts a son, Henry. Later, Regina's curse is broken by Snow White's daughter, Emma (Henry's biological mother), and Regina decides to try and redeem herself for her son. In time, Regina manages to make amends with Snow White, Emma and her other enemies. She also meets her long lost half-sister, Zelena the Wicked Witch, and falls in love with Robin Hood. In the fifth season, following Robin's death, Regina uses Dr. Jekyll's serum to separate herself from the darkness within her, creating the Evil Queen as a separate individual. In the seventh season, set many years later, Regina is crowned the Good Queen when the realms are united.

Literature
In Neil Gaiman's 1994 short story "Snow, Glass, Apples," the Queen is a tragic hero protagonist who struggles desperately to save the kingdom from her vampiric stepdaughter.
In the DC Universe, the Queen of Fables was a scheming, villainous witch who, in her youth, wrought hell on earth until she was trapped in a book by her own stepdaughter, Snow White. Centuries later, she was freed accidentally by Snow White's descendants and has since faced many Justice League superheroes like Superman and Wonder Woman, who the Queen thought was Snow White due to her great beauty.
In the children's book trilogy Half Upon a Time by James Riley (2010-2013), the characters set out to rescue May's grandmother, who they believe is Snow White. She is eventually revealed as the Wicked Queen and the true antagonist of the series.
In Marissa Meyer’s The Lunar Chronicles (2012-2015), Queen Levana is the main antagonist and the equivalent of the Evil Queen. She is the ruler of the moon, aunt of the protagonist Cinder, and stepmother of Princess Winter. Severely scarred from childhood burns, she either wears a veil or uses her psychic abilities to glamour herself with extreme beauty. Fairest, a prequel novella, focuses on her backstory.
Dark Shimmer by Donna Jo Napoli (2015) reimagines "Snow White" in medieval Italy, focused on the backstory of the Evil Queen figure. Dolce is an innocent, kind woman who grew up thinking she was hideous. Her mood swings and attempts to murder her beloved stepdaughter are the result of mercury poisoning from making mirrors.
Girls Made of Snow and Glass by Melissa Bashardoust (2017) focuses on the relationship between Snow White and the Evil Queen, who is a complex, sympathetic character. Mina is a magician's daughter whose heart was magically replaced with one of glass. Her drive for political power, combined with manipulation by others, bring her into conflict with her stepdaughter Princess Lynet.

See also

Black Annis
Wicked fairy (Sleeping Beauty)

References

External links

Female characters in fairy tales
Literary characters introduced in 1812
Fictional German people
Fictional characters without a name
Fictional murderers
Fictional queens
Fictional shapeshifters
Fictional witches
Female literary villains
 
Witchcraft in fairy tales
Literary archetypes